Route 185 or Highway 185 may refer to:

Canada
  Quebec Route 185

India
 National Highway 185 (India)

Ireland
 R185 road (Ireland)

Japan
 Japan National Route 185

Poland 
  Voivodeship road 185

United States
 Interstate 185
 U.S. Route 185 (former)
 Alabama State Route 185
 Arkansas Highway 185
 California State Route 185
 Connecticut Route 185
 Florida State Road 185 (former)
 Georgia State Route 185
Hawaii Route 185
 Illinois Route 185
 K-185 (Kansas highway)
 Kentucky Route 185
 Maine State Route 185
 Maryland Route 185
 M-185 (Michigan highway)
 Missouri Route 185
 New Jersey Route 185
 New Mexico State Road 185
 New York State Route 185
 Ohio State Route 185
 Pennsylvania Route 185 (former)
 South Carolina Highway 185
 Tennessee State Route 185
 Texas State Highway 185
 Texas State Highway Spur 185
 Farm to Market Road 185 (Texas)
 Urban Road 185 (Texas, signed as Farm to Market Road 185)
 Utah State Route 185 (former)
 Virginia State Route 185
 Wisconsin Highway 185
Territories
 Puerto Rico Highway 185